Petrana is a community of the city of Kozani in northern Greece. Located east of the city centre, it has a population of 696 (2011).

References

Kozani
Populated places in Kozani (regional unit)